Kheireddine Merzougui (born 16 August 1992 in Aïn Defla) is an Algerian footballer who plays for club MC Alger.

Merzougi finished as the top scorer of the 2014–15 Algerian Ligue Professionnelle 2 with 17 goals for RC Relizane.

In June 2015, Merzougi signed a two-year contract with MC Alger.

Doping ban 
In January 2016 it was announced that Merzougi was banned from sports for two years by the Confederation of African Football after testing positive for Methylhexanamine. However, in March 2016, FIFA confirmed they were giving an extended four-year ban to apply worldwide through 24 January 2020.

Honours
 Algerian Ligue Professionnelle 2 top scorer: 2014–15

References

External links
 
 

1992 births
Algerian footballers
Algerian Ligue Professionnelle 1 players
Algerian Ligue 2 players
ASO Chlef players
MC Alger players
Living people
People from Aïn Defla
RC Relizane players
Association football forwards
21st-century Algerian people